The following lists events that happened during 1936 in New Zealand.

The shape of New Zealand politics for the next five decades was defined when, in the aftermath of their heavy defeat by Labour, the United and Reform parties merged to form the New Zealand National Party. In the meantime, the Labour government began implementing significant social changes.

Population
A New Zealand census was held in March 1936.

Incumbents

Regal and viceregal
Head of State – George V (until 20 January), Edward VIII (20 January to 11 December), George VI
Governor-General – The Viscount Galway GCMG DSO OBE PC

Government
The 25th New Zealand Parliament continued with the Labour Party in government.

Speaker of the House – Bill Barnard (Labour Party)
Prime Minister – Michael Joseph Savage
Minister of Finance – Walter Nash
Minister of Foreign Affairs – Michael Joseph Savage
Attorney-General – Rex Mason
Chief Justice – Sir Michael Myers

Parliamentary opposition
 Leader of the Opposition –  George Forbes (United/Reform Party until May, then National Party), succeeded in November by Adam Hamilton (National).

Main centre leaders
Mayor of Auckland – Ernest Davis
Mayor of Wellington – Thomas Hislop
Mayor of Christchurch – Dan Sullivan then John Beanland
Mayor of Dunedin – Edwin Thomas Cox

Events 
 25 March: First session of the 25th Parliament commences.
 11 June: Parliament goes into recess.
 21 June: Parliament resumes.
 31 October: First session of the 25th Parliament concludes.

Arts and literature

See 1936 in art, 1936 in literature, :Category:1936 books

Music

See: 1936 in music

Radio

 Radio broadcasting of sessions of Parliament commences.

See: Public broadcasting in New Zealand

Film
Phar Lap's Son
The Wagon and the Star
On the Friendly Road

See: :Category:1936 film awards, 1936 in film, List of New Zealand feature films, Cinema of New Zealand, :Category:1936 films

Sport

Chess
 The 45th National Chess Championship was held in Christchurch, and was won by A.W. Gyles of Wellington.

Golf
 The 26th New Zealand Open championship was won by Andrew Shaw, his 7th title.
 The 40th National Amateur Championships were held in New Plymouth
 Men: J.P. Hornabrook (Manawatu)
 Women: Miss E. White-Parsons

Horse racing

Harness racing
 New Zealand Trotting Cup – Indianapolis (3rd win)
 Auckland Trotting Cup – King's Warrior

Lawn bowls
The national outdoor lawn bowls championships are held in Christchurch.
 Men's singles champion – Frank Livingstone (Onehunga Bowling Club)
 Men's pair champions – J.W. Turpin, H. Haworth (skip) (Canterbury Bowling Club)
 Men's fours champions – C.H. Elsom, J.W. Turpin, C.J. Shaw, R. Haworth (skip) (Canterbury Bowling Club)

Olympic Games

Rugby league
New Zealand national rugby league team

Rugby union
:Category:Rugby union in New Zealand, :Category:All Blacks
 Ranfurly Shield

Soccer
 An Australian national side tours New Zealand, beating the home team heavily in all three internationals:
 4 July, Dunedin: NZ 1–7 Australia
 11 July, Wellington: NZ 0–10 Australia
 18 July, Auckland: NZ 1–4 Australia
 The Chatham Cup is won by Western of Christchurch who beat Auckland Thistle 3–2 in the final.
 Provincial league champions:
	Auckland:	Thistle
	Canterbury:	Western
	Hawke's Bay:	Watersiders
	Nelson:	YMCA
	Otago:	Seacliff
	Southland:	Corinthians
	Wanganui:	Thistle
	Wellington:	Hospital

Births

January
 5 January
 Reg Hart, rugby league player
 Terry Lineen, rugby union player
 6 January – Terence O'Brien, diplomat
 7 January
 Denis Pain, jurist, sports administrator
 Alan Powell, historian
 8 January – John McCullough, rugby union player
 12 January – Graham Billing, writer
 13 January – Michael Selby, geomorphologist, university administrator
 18 January – Hugh Anderson, motorcycle racer
 21 January – Helen Clark, marine zoologist
 22 January
 Robert Anderson, politician
 Don McIver, army general
 Nyree Dawn Porter, actor
 31 January – Georgina Kirby, Māori leader, women's rights activist

February
 3 February – Graham Finlay, boxer
 10 February – Gerald Stewart, cricketer
 11 February – Bramwell Cook, gastroenterologist
 12 February – Jane Ritchie, psychologist
 13 February – Steve Nesbit, rugby union player
 15 February – Russell Marshall, politician, diplomat
 16 February
 Bruce Beetham, politician
 Noel Everett, sailor
 18 February – Pavel Tichý, logician
 21 February – Bev Brentnall, cricketer
 28 February – Dot Coleman, fencer

March
 10 March – David Harrington, local-body politician
 14 March
 Kevin Barry, boxing coach
 Bob Charles, golfer
 19 March – Robert Carswell, cricketer
 21 March – Margaret Mahy, writer
 22 March – Douglas Gray, cricketer
 24 March
 Wally Hirsh, public servant, writer
 James Morrison, cricketer
 25 March – Julian Jack, physiologist

April
 1 April – Desmond Park, cricketer
 3 April – Tama Poata, writer, actor, human rights activist
 5 April – Robin Carrell, haematologist
 9 April – Mary Webb, cricketer
 15 April – Michael Brown, Anglican priest
 19 April – Anthony Small, cricketer
 22 April
 Kevin Barry, rugby union player
 Glen Evans, local-body politician
 23 April – John D'Arcy, cricketer
 24 April – Ngai Tupa, Cook Islands politician
 26 April – Robert Mahuta, Māori leader, academic
 27 April
 Peter Nicholls, sculptor
 Betty Steffensen, netball player, coach, umpire and administrator
 28 April – Ans Westra, photographer
 29 April – Peter Atkins, Anglican bishop

May
 1 May – Glenys Arthur, neurologist
 3 May – Raymond Hawthorne, theatre director
 6 May
 Pat Walsh, rugby union player and selector
 Cliff Whiting, artist, heritage advocate
 7 May – Kenneth Ferries, cricketer
 8 May – Ruia Morrison, tennis player
 29 May – Murray Mills, Anglican bishop
 30 May – Roy Harford, cricketer

June
 2 June – James Wright, cricketer
 3 June – Colin Meads, rugby union player
 4 June – Robert Kelly, cricketer
 6 June – Precious McKenzie, weightlifter
 16 June – Graeme Barrow, author
 18 June – Denny Hulme, racing driver
 21 June – Colin Nicholson, lawyer, judge
 23 June – Richard Johnstone, cyclist, cycling coach
 30 June – Peter Bloomfield, cricketer

July
 1 July
 Jonathan Elworthy, politician
 Jim Savage, athlete
 16 July
 Tamati Reedy, rugby union player, public servant, academic
 Rob Storey, farmers' leader, politician
 23 July – Graham Buist, cricketer
 24 July – Thomas O'Neil, cricketer
 28 July – Donald Eagle, cyclist
 31 July – Mike Watt, sport shooter

August
 1 August – Elizabeth McRae, actor
 5 August – Bruce Stewart, playwright
 7 August – Joy Cowley, author
 8 August – David Penman, Anglican archbishop
 10 August – Marilyn Pryor, anti-abortion activist
 13 August
 Bob Graham, rugby union player and coach
 George Newton, weightlifter
 15 August
 Hamish Keith, writer, art curator
 Trevor Moffitt, artist
 J. B. Munro, politician, disability advocate
 19 August – Norman Woods, cricketer
 20 August – Kevin Briscoe, rugby union player
 23 August – John Stopford, rugby league player

September
 1 September – Selwyn Cushing, businessman
 7 September – Alistair Soper, rugby union player
 9 September – Dorothy Grover, philosopher
 10 September
 Howard Carter, Pentacostal Christian leader
 Michael Corballis, psychologist
 Michael Hartshorn, organic chemist
 Bill Massey, softball player, coach and umpire
 14 September – Robert Page, rowing coxswain
 17 September – Barry Dineen, cricketer, rugby union player, businessman
 18 September – Margaret Belcher, literary scholar
 20 September – Murray McEwan, cricketer
 21 September – Peter McLeavey, art dealer

October
 4 October – Graham Davy, athlete, sports administrator
 10 October
 Artie Dick, cricketer
 Carmen Rupe, drag performer, brothel keeper, LGBT rights activist
 20 October – Jim Gerard, politician
 23 October – Barry Sinclair, cricketer
 31 October – Reuben Ngata, parasports competitor

November
 6 November – Elva Simpson, netball player
 9 November – Graham Hamer, rugby union coach
 20 November – Graeme Tarr, cricketer
 22 November – Ian Pool, demographer
 23 November – Rex Pickering, rugby union player
 24 November – Avinash Deobhakta, lawyer, judge
 25 November – Jock Bilger, sailor
 27 November – Terry O'Sullivan, rugby union player
 29 November – Peter Cullinane, Roman Catholic bishop

December
 5 December – Evelyn Stokes, geographer
 12 December – Wilf Haskell, cricketer, sports historian
 23 December – Paddy Donovan, boxer, rugby union player
 25 December – Sonia Cox, badminton and tennis player

Undated
 Beau Vite, Thoroughbred racehorse
 David Beauchamp, civil engineer
 Michael Friedlander, businessman, philanthropist
 James Greig, potter
 High Caste, Thoroughbred racehorse
 Elric Hooper, actor, theatre director
 Judy Howat, lawn bowls player
 Sani Lakatani, Niuean politician
 Terry McGee, geographer
 Stanley Palmer, painter and printmaker
 Jenny Pattrick, novelist, jeweller
 John Riordan, jockey
 Jim Siers, author, filmmaker, record producer
 Adrienne Stewart, arts patron (born in Australia)
 Barrie Truman, association football coach
 David Vere-Jones, mathematical statistician
 Murray C. Wells, accountancy academic

Deaths

January–March
 5 January – Arthur Singe, rugby league player
 16 January – Sir William Hall-Jones, politician, prime minister (1906) (born 1851)
 20 January – James Clark, politician, mayor of Dunedin (1915–1919) (born 1870)
 5 February – Timothy O'Connor, rugby union player (born 1860)
 6 February – Edwin Bezar, soldier, author (born 1838)
 8 February – Robert Holmes, civil engineer (born 1856)
 19 February
 Andrew Entrican, businessman, politician (born 1858)
 Malcolm McGregor, World War I flying ace, aviation pioneer (born 1896)
 3 March – Lucy Lovell-Smith, temperance worker and women's rights advocate (born 1861)
 4 March – Arthur Henry Adams, journalist, author (born 1872)
 10 March – David Kennedy, priest, astronomer (born 1864)
 12 March – Janet Williamson, nurse (born 1862)
 13 March
 Sir Francis Bell, politician, mayor of Wellington (1891–1893), prime minister (1925) (born 1851)
 Elizabeth Herriott, scientist, academic (born 1882)
 14 March – William Holdship, cricketer (born 1872)
 17 March – Albert Duder, mariner, harbourmaster (born 1856)
 29 March – Forrest Ross, mountaineer, journalist, writer (born 1860)

April–June
 18 April – John Swan, architect (born 1874)
 21 April – Harold Smith, politician (born 1866)
 5 May – Sir Joseph Kinsey, businessman, bibliophile, philanthropist (born 1852)
 10 May
 Donald Fuller, cricketer (born 1869)
 Isaac Richards, Anglican bishop (born 1859)
 11 May – Frederick Mason, cricketer (born 1881)
 19 May – Thomas William Kirk, biologist, scientific administrator (born 1856)
 21 May – John Spencer, rugby union and rugby league player (born 1880)
 26 May – James Bradney, politician, shipping proprietor (born 1853)
 3 June – Cedric Carr, botanist (born 1892)
 16 June – Alexander Cairns, cricketer (born 1850)
 24 June – Sir Frederick Chapman, judge (born 1849)

July–September
 8 July – Ernest Sutherland, field athlete (born 1894)
 9 July – Frances Haselden, headmistress (born )
 30 July – Sir James Mills, businessman, politician (born 1847)
 9 August – George Butler, artist (born 1872)
 12 August – Oscar Michelsen, missionary (born 1844)
 17 August – Francis Henry Smith, politician (born 1868)
 12 September – Richard Moore, politician (born 1849)
 17 September – Ettie Rout, campaigner for safe sex (born 1877)
 18 September – Emily White, gardener, writer (born 1839)
 27 September – Archibald Hawke, businessman, sports administrator, politician (born 1862)

October–December
 7 October – Frank Hockly, politician
 15 October – Allen Bell, politician (born 1870)
 18 October – James Hay, cricketer (born 1885)
 19 October – William Chapple, politician (born 1864)
 5 November – Tahupōtiki Haddon, Methodist minister (born 1866)
 9 November – Edward McCausland, rugby union player (born 1865)
 13 November – Charles Miles (born 1850)
 25 November – John MacGregor, politician (born )
 23 December – Alf Hadden, cricketer (born 1877)
 27 December – William Morris, public servant (born 1853)
 31 December – John Dumbell, rugby union player (born 1859)

See also
History of New Zealand
List of years in New Zealand
Military history of New Zealand
Timeline of New Zealand history
Timeline of New Zealand's links with Antarctica
Timeline of the New Zealand environment

References

External links

 
Years of the 20th century in New Zealand